Denise Carol Goldsworthy  (born 1964/1965) is an Australian business executive. After a 30-year career in the mining industry she opened Alternate Futures, a consultancy business, in 2013. She has also held a number of non-executive board and chairman roles. In January 2022 she took over as fifth Chancellor of Edith Cowan University.

Career 
Goldsworthy joined BHP Steel in 1982 and studied part-time at the University of Newcastle, graduating with a bachelor of metallurgy and University Medal in 1989. As well as formal learning, she was constantly learning on the job, working in 14 different jobs and being promoted to senior manager. She worked as principal consultant and then in general management roles at Hamersley Iron from 1998 to 2002.

In 2002 she joined Rio Tinto and filled a number of roles, including managing director of Dampier Salt and HIsmelt and, finally, chief commercial officer, Autonomous Haul Trucks.

Leaving Rio Tinto, she founded Alternate Futures, of which she is the managing principal, in October 2013.

Goldsworthy serves on a number of boards, including Western Power. As of 2021, she is chair of both ChemCentre WA and the Trustees of the Navy Clearance Divers' Trust (WA).

Previous board appointments include the Minerals Research Institute of WA (2016–2020), Export Finance Australia (2014–2020).

Goldsworthy has been a member of the Council of Edith Cowan University (ECU) since 2013. She was elected fifth Chancellor of ECU and took up her appointment in January 2022.

She is a member of Chief Executive Women.

Honours and recognition 
Goldsworthy was appointed an Officer of the Order of Australia in the 2020 Queen's Birthday Honours for "distinguished service to business, particularly to technological innovation and research in the mining and manufacturing sectors". In 2010 she was Telstra Australian Business Woman of the Year. She was inducted into the Western Australian Women’s Hall of Fame and awarded the Alumni Award for National Leadership by the University of Newcastle in 2011. She was appointed Fellow of the Australian Academy of Technology and Engineering in 2013.

References

External links 

 
 

Living people
University of Newcastle (Australia) alumni
Australian women business executives
21st-century Australian businesswomen
21st-century Australian businesspeople
Officers of the Order of Australia
Fellows of the Australian Academy of Technological Sciences and Engineering
Australian metallurgists
Year of birth missing (living people)